Soluk Rural District is in the Central District of Hashtrud County, East Azerbaijan province, Iran. At the National Census of 2006, its population was 4,277 in 885 households. There were 3,959 inhabitants in 1,070 households at the following census of 2011. At the most recent census of 2016, the population of the rural district was 3,608 in 1,067 households. The largest of its 13 villages was Seyd Beyg, with 546 people.

References 

Hashtrud County

Rural Districts of East Azerbaijan Province

Populated places in East Azerbaijan Province

Populated places in Hashtrud County